"You Like Me  Don't You" is a song written and recorded by American R&B singer Jermaine Jackson. It was released as the second single from his 1980 album, Jermaine, in January 1981.

Record World said that "Jermaine exhibits a sense of maturity and confidence that make this a totally engrossing piece."

Charts

References

1980 songs
1981 singles
Jermaine Jackson songs
Songs written by Jermaine Jackson